A dirk is a long bladed thrusting dagger.  Historically, it gained its name from the Highland Dirk (Scots Gaelic "Dearg") where it was a personal weapon of officers engaged in naval hand-to-hand combat during the Age of Sail as well as the personal sidearm of Highlanders. It was also the traditional sidearm of the Highland Clansman and later used by the officers, pipers, and drummers of Scottish Highland regiments around 1725 to 1800 and by Japanese naval officers.

Etymology
The term is associated with Scotland in the Early Modern Era, being attested from about 1600. The term was spelled dork or dirk during the 17th century, presumed related to the Danish, Dutch and Swedish dolk, and the German dolch, tolch; from a West Slavic Tillich. The exact etymology is unclear. The modern spelling dirk is probably due to Samuel Johnson's 1755 Dictionary. The term is also used for "dagger" generically, especially in the context of prehistoric daggers such as the Oxborough dirk.

Highland dirk

The Scottish dirk (also "Highland dirk", Scottish Gaelic: Biodag),  as a symbolic traditional and ceremonial weapon of the Highland Cathairean (cateran or warrior), is worn by officers, pipers and drummers of Scottish Highland regiments.  The development of the Scottish dirk as a weapon is unrelated to that of the naval dirk; it is a modern continuation of the 16th-century ballock or rondel dagger.

The traditional Scottish dirk is a probable development from the 16th century but like all medieval societies, the Highlander needed a knife for everyday use. The dirk became symbolic of a Highland man’s honour and oaths were sworn on the steel which was believed to be holy. The following highlights the importance of the dirk in Highland culture:

The dirk occupies a unique niche in Highland culture and history. Many Highland Scots were too cash-poor to buy a sword, following the Disarming Acts enacted to erode Highland martial insurrections but virtually every male carried a dirk—and carried it everywhere! If in Japan the katana was the soul of the Samurai, in Scotland the dirk was the heart of the Highlander. In many warrior cultures oaths were sworn on one's sword. Among the Gael, however, binding oaths with the force of a geas (involving dire supernatural penalties for breaking such an oath) were sworn on one's dirk. The English, aware of this, used the custom against the Highlanders after Culloden: When Highland dress was prohibited in 1747 those Gael who could not read or sign an oath were required to swear a verbal oath, "in the Irish (Scots Gaelic) tongue and upon the holy iron of their dirks", not to possess any gun, sword, or pistol, or to use tartan: "... and if I do so may I be cursed in my undertakings, family and property, may I be killed in battle as a coward, and lie without burial in a strange land, far from the graves of my forefathers and kindred; may all this come across me if I break my oath."

During the period of proscription, only service in a British regiment permitted Highlanders to bear their traditional arms and dress. The 78th Fraser Highlanders, raised in 1757, wore full highland dress uniform; their equipment was described by Major-General James Stewart in 1780 as including a "musket and broadsword, to which many soldiers added the dirk at their own expense."

As is well documented in the oral traditions and in almost every title written prior to 1979; The perceived "holiness" of the steel is likely to have originated in folk superstitions. These origins are often ascribed to "magic" in the forging of Germanic steel. For this reason, it is established that Highlanders retained reverence for blades forged from Solingen steel.

The modern development of the Scottish dirk into a ceremonial weapon occurred during the 19th century.  The shape of the grip developed from the historical more cylindrical form to a shape intended to represent the thistle. Fancier fittings, often of silver, became popular shortly after 1800. The hilts of modern Scottish dirks are often carved from dark colored wood such as bog oak or ebony. Hilts and scabbards are often lavishly decorated with silver mounts and have pommels set with cairngorm stones. The blades measure 12" in length and are single edged with decorative file work known as "jimping" on the unsharpened back edge of the blade. When worn, the dirk normally hangs by a leather strap known as a "frog" from a dirk belt, which is a wide leather belt having a large, usually ornate buckle, that is worn around the waist with a kilt.  Many Scottish dirks carry a smaller knife and fork which fit into compartments on the front of the sheath, and a smaller knife known as a sgian dubh is also worn tucked into the top of the hose when wearing a kilt.

Naval dirk

A thrusting weapon, the naval dirk originally functioned as a boarding weapon and as a functional fighting dagger.  During the days of sail, midshipmen and officers wore dirks; the daggers gradually evolved into ceremonial weapons and badges of office.  In the Royal Navy, the naval dirk is still presented to junior officers; the basic design of the weapon has changed little in the last 500 years.

The naval dirk (Polish: kordzik, Russian: кортик) became part of the uniform of naval officers and civilian officials in the Navy Ministry of the Russian Empire, and in the Soviet navy an element of the dress uniform of officers.  Later, it became an element of other uniforms as well, e.g. of officers in the Russian and Polish army and air force and of the police forces in some countries.

In the US, the dirk was introduced by Scottish immigrants in the 1700s.  This was originally a single-edged weapon, but by 1745 more commonly had a double-edged blade making the dirk more or less synonymous with the dagger.  Dirks were often made from old sword blades.  In the nineteenth centuries dirks started to be made with a curved blade, but returned to a straight blade by the end of the century.  Some were long enough to be considered a short sword.

See also
Kindjal
Knife fight
List of blade materials

References

External links

Spotlight: The Scottish Dirk (myArmoury.com article)

Blade weapons
Daggers
Weapons of Scotland